The New Class may refer to:

New Class, or new class; the class in the Communist system
The New Class: An Analysis of the Communist System (book)
BMW New Class a series of cars no longer produced

See also
 Middle class, the newest class and between lower class and upper class
 New (disambiguation)
 Class (disambiguation)
 Saved by the Bell: The New Class (TV series) school sitcom
 Paranormal State: The New Class (TV series) paranormal docudrama pilot and spin-off of Paranormal State